Black art  may refer to:

 African-American art
 Black Art, record label run by Jamaican producer Lee "Scratch" Perry
 Black Arts Movement
 Black Art (poem), written by Amiri Baraka
 Black art (theatre), an optical effect in stage magic

See also
 Black Magic (disambiguation)
 Black Ops (disambiguation)
 Black Paintings, a group of 14 paintings by Francisco Goya
 Blackwork, a form of embroidery generally worked in black thread
 Dark arts (disambiguation)